VVS Moscow ( / in English: Moscow Military Air Force) was a Soviet sports club representing the Soviet Air Force. Among the sports the club participated in were football, ice hockey, basketball, and volleyball. They won the Soviet national basketball league championship in 1952, as well as the Soviet national volleyball league championship in 1952, and the Soviet national ice hockey league championship three times, in the years 1951, 1952, and 1953 following the 1950 Sverdlovsk Air Disaster.

Lieutenant General Vasily Stalin, the son of Joseph Stalin, was the president of the club. Vsevolod Bobrov played on the football team 1950–52 and the ice hockey team 1949–53. Viktor Tikhonov, the future Soviet national team's coach, played on the ice hockey team, as did Boris Kulagin, future coach of other Moscow-based ice hockey teams. Yevgeny Babich, otherwise a CDKA/CSKA player, played with the VVS hockey team for its three championship seasons.

Hockey team

In 1946–47, the VVS hockey team played in the new Soviet Championship with Anatoly Tarasov as player-coach. VVS finished second in group A in the opening phase and fifth overall. Tarasov scored 14 goals, the highest total of the season. Angry with Vasily Stalin in the next season, he quit and joined CDKA, later known as CSKA. At the end of the 1947–48 season, after the team finished seventh out of ten, Vasily Stalin brought the first line of forwards from Spartak Moscow to the team: Zdenek Zigmund, Ivan Novikov, and Yuri Tarasov. They finished second in 1948–49.

On January 7, 1950, as the team was on the way to Chelyabinsk, their airplane crashed in Yekaterinburg (then Sverdlovsk), and the only surviving players were Viktor Shuvalov and Vsevolod Bobrov, who were not on board. Bobrov overslept and took the train instead, and Shuvalov was injured. VVS finished fourth in that season.

The 1950–51 season saw the best players from other teams starting to play on VVS, and the team won the league championship. That year was also the first year of the USSR Cup, where VVS lost the final 4–3 to Krylya Sovetov, also of Moscow.

In 1951–52, VVS won another championship and the USSR Cup, beating CDSA (CDKA before, CSKA later) 3–2 in the tiebreaking game for the former and Krylya Sovetov 6–5 in the final for the latter. They won the championship again in 1952–53 despite Bobrov's injury. After Joseph Stalin died, destalinization resulted in the unceremonious dissolution of VVS.

Football team history
{|class="wikitable"
|- style="background:#efefef;"
! Season
! Div.
! Pos.
! Pl.
! W
! D
! L
! GS
! GA
! P
!Domestic Cup
! Top scorer
|-
|align=center|1945
|align=center|Group 2 (2nd)
|align=center|2
|align=center|17
|align=center|9
|align=center|6
|align=center|2
|align=center|32
|align=center|12
|align=center|24
|align=center|Round of 32
|
|-
|align=center|1946
|align=center|Group 2, South (2nd)
|align=center|1
|align=center|24
|align=center|16
|align=center|5
|align=center|3
|align=center|56
|align=center|22
|align=center|37
|align=center|Round of 16
|
|-
|align=center|1947
|align=center|Group 1 (1st)
|align=center|13
|align=center|24
|align=center|3
|align=center|5
|align=center|16
|align=center|21
|align=center|54
|align=center|11
|align=center|Round of 16
|align=center|Viktor Ponomaryov (8)
|-
|align=center|1948
|align=center|Group 1 (1st)
|align=center|9
|align=center|26
|align=center|9
|align=center|3
|align=center|14
|align=center|33
|align=center|52
|align=center|21
|align=center|Quarterfinal
|align=center|Viktor Piskovatsky (8)
|-
|align=center|1949
|align=center|Group 1 (1st)
|align=center|8
|align=center|34
|align=center|13
|align=center|9
|align=center|12
|align=center|48
|align=center|42
|align=center|35
|align=center|Round of 64
|align=center|Sergei Korshunov (12)
|-
|align=center|1950
|align=center|Class A (1st)
|align=center|4
|align=center|36
|align=center|20
|align=center|5
|align=center|11
|align=center|78
|align=center|52
|align=center|45
|align=center|Quarterfinal
|align=center|Viktor Shuvalov (16)
|-
|align=center|1951
|align=center|Class A (1st)
|align=center|10
|align=center|28
|align=center|11
|align=center|4
|align=center|13
|align=center|44
|align=center|56
|align=center|26
|  style="text-align:center; background:bronze;"|Semifinal
|align=center|Sergei Korshunov (13)
|-
|align=center|1952
|align=center|Class A (1st)
|align=center|11
|align=center|13
|align=center|2
|align=center|6
|align=center|5
|align=center|11
|align=center|14
|align=center|10
|align=center|Quarterfinal
|align=center|Sergei Korshunov (4)
|}

Notable players
 Vsevolod Bobrov
 Anatoli Isayev
 Konstantin Krizhevsky
 Aleksei Paramonov
 Anatoli Porkhunov

References

Association football clubs established in 1945
Association football clubs disestablished in 1952
Defunct football clubs in Moscow
Sports clubs in Moscow
Armed Forces sports society
Soviet Air Force
Military sports clubs
1945 establishments in Russia
1952 disestablishments in Russia
Soviet Top League clubs
Military association football clubs in Russia